Beşiktaş Jimnastik Kulübü is a Turkish multi-sport club, founded in 1903 in the Beşiktaş district of Istanbul. As of 2018, the club is active in 14 different branches. Since its foundation in 1903, 33 individuals have served the club as president. Süleyman Seba was the longest serving president of the club, having served for 16 consecutive years between 1984 and 2000.

List of presidents

Notes

Citations

External links
 Official Club Website 
 Turkish Football Leagues archive on TFF

Beşiktaş J.K.
Beşiktaş J.K. presidents
Istanbul-related lists